The Alberta Fish and Game Association ("AFGA") is a charitable organization dedicated to fish and wildlife conservation in the Canadian province of Alberta. The AFGA was founded in 1908 when a group of anglers and hunters first met in Calgary, Alberta. It now claims to have about 14,000 members province-wide.

The AFGA is a founding member of a number of sister conservation organizations. In 1962, along with representatives of the 9 other provinces, it helped found the Canadian Wildlife Federation (CWF). At the time it was felt that the organized hunters and anglers of Canada needed a national organization that would represent conservation. Today, it is still only the AFGA and its sister organizations from across Canada that constitute voting members of the CWF, although a significant amount of funds are raised from non-voting members.

In 1997, the AFGA was instrumental in the founding of the Alberta Conservation Association (ACA). The ACA acts as a delegated administration organization at arm's length from government, and administers funds received primarily from the sale of hunting and fishing licenses. At the time, the provincial government was going through a significant reorganization, and $18 million that were in a designated fund for conservation were being threatened to be absorbed by the provincial Treasurer. As a representative of the hunters and anglers who pay into this fund, the AFGA continues to be involved with the ACA.

External links

Nature conservation organizations based in Canada
Charities based in Canada
Organizations based in Calgary
Fishing in Canada